Victoria College, Belfast is a voluntary non-denominational Independent grammar school in Cranmore Park, Belfast, Northern Ireland. In 2022, the college's stated enrolment was 870.

Victoria College was awarded specialist school status in science in September 2009. The college also specialises in other STEM-related areas (Science, Technology, Engineering and Maths.)

History 
Founded by Mrs Margaret Byers (1832–1912) - an important pioneer of women's education in Ireland - in 1859, and first located in Belfast city centre at Wellington Place, the school was then known as The Ladies' Collegiate School, Belfast.

In 1888, Queen Victoria's Jubilee Year, the name of the school was changed by Royal Command to Victoria College and School. A century later, Victoria College amalgamated with Richmond Lodge School, a neighbouring girls' school of similar ethos. Richmond Lodge had opened in 1889 by the Misses Hardy on the Stranmillis Road. It moved to the Malone Road in 1913 and soon acquired full academic recognition. Richmond Lodge past pupils continue their association with the school through the Arellian Association.

From 1947 to 1970, the art department at Victoria College was headed by Mercy Hunter, a notable calligrapher and influential teacher.

Over the past 150 years, Victoria College (as it is now called) has relocated four times. Former Belfast locations include Howard Street, Pakenham Place and Lower Crescent before the current school was established at Cranmore in the 1970s. School house names reflect the past locations.

Location
The school has two campuses: the Richmond Campus (for Forms 1 & 2) and the Cranmore Campus (for Forms 3-U6). In addition, a kindergarten for boys and girls is located within the Richmond Campus and the girls only Preparatory Department is located on the Cranmore Campus.

The whole school is situated within extensive mature grounds in South Belfast, between the Lisburn Road and the Malone Road, two main arterial routes making it convenient to city, town and country bus routes and the local railway network. It is also within walking distance of the Queen's University Belfast and the Ulster Museum and many local art galleries and theatres.

Staff 
The school is staffed by 82 full- and part-time teachers and 30 support staff.

Boarding 
Drumglass House was built in 1820 and serves as the Boarding Department for girls of all ages and all backgrounds. It is located within the grounds of the Cranmore Campus. The Boarding Department caters for up to 60 boarders, many from Europe or East Asia.

STEM related achievements 
In 2010, a team of pupils from the College won their regional heat of the  Faraday Challenge and subsequently took first prize at the National Finals held in Manchester.

Exam results 
GCSE and A-level results in the college are consistently high every year. The exam boards offered to students are Edexcel, AQA, OCR, CCEA, WJEC. The % pass rate at grades A* to C (exams at age 16 - GCSE or equivalent) is 97%; the % pass rate (exams at age 18 - 'A' Level or equivalent) is 100%.

Uniform

Winter uniform 
Grey blazer
Regulation knitted scarf         (1st & 2nd Forms)
Optional fleece scarf             (3-U6th Forms)
Maroon skirt.
White shirt.
School tie.
Regulation grey pullover - available in either wool or courtelle with stripes at V-neck.
Regulation grey cardigan, striped at edges - Sixth Form only
Grey knee-length socks or tights.
Plain black, flat, laced, shoes.

Summer uniform 
Grey blazer.
A regulation grey and blue striped dress to be worn May, June and September. (Prep)
A regulation white and maroon striped open necked shirt to be worn May, June and September. (1st & 2nd Forms)
A regulation white open necked shirt to be worn May, June and September. (3rd-U6th Forms)
Regulation grey pullover.
Plain grey knee length socks or grey tights.
Plain shoes, slight heel (laces or straps)

References

External links 

Victoria College website

Grammar schools in Belfast
Girls' schools in Northern Ireland
Boarding schools in Northern Ireland
Boarding schools in Ireland
Educational institutions established in 1859
1859 establishments in Ireland
Specialist colleges in Northern Ireland